Travis William Cooper (born 21 December 1993) is an Australian professional association football player. He plays as a striker or right winger for South West Queensland Thunder in the National Premier Leagues.

Early life
Cooper attended The King's School, in North Parramatta, Australia. He also attended the University of Technology, Sydney, for a short period before moving to Venlo.

Senior career
In August 2012, Cooper signed a two-year contract with VVV-Venlo, who were playing in the Eredivisie at the time.

He made his professional debut for the club on 9 August 2013, against Willem II, coming off the bench in the 86th minute, and provided the assist for the second goal in the side's 2–0 victory.

Cooper scored his first goal for the club in the side's 3–2 victory over Helmond Sport, coming on the 85th minute to score.

On 3 February 2015, he signed a contract with Newcastle Jets for the remainder of the 2014–15 A-League season.

References

External links
 Voetbal International profile 
 

1993 births
Living people
Australian soccer players
Association football forwards
Newcastle Jets FC players
VVV-Venlo players
Eerste Divisie players
Expatriate footballers in the Netherlands
Australian expatriate soccer players